Koel Mallick (born Rukmini Mallick on 28 April 1982) is an Indian actress who appears in Bengali films. She is the daughter of actor Ranjit Mallick and Deepa Mallick. She made her film debut in Nater Guru (2003), Mon Mane Na (2008 film), Besh Korechi Prem Korechi.

Early life and education 

Koel was born in Kolkata to Bengali film actor Ranjit Mallick and Deepa Mallick, of Kolkata's notable Mallick Bari of Bhowanipore (i.e., the Mallick family, which is closely associated with the powerful Barat and Gupta families), known for its Durga Puja. Koel did her schooling from Modern High School for Girls, and completed a BSc (honors) in psychology from the Gokhale Memorial Girls' College, an affiliated college of the University of Calcutta.

Career

Film 
Mallick's screen debut was in Nater Guru – opposite Jeet. Nater Guru was a "runaway success" at the box office. The film, released in 2003, marked Mallick's entry into Tollywood. She also won her first award for Best Actor in Leading Role Female  from 4th Tele Cine Awards 2004 for Nater Guru.  Nater Guru, which has Jeet in the male lead, sees Mallick playing the role of a 23-year-old girl named Monica. Since the release of Nater Guru the pair has worked together often, appearing in eleven films.

In 2004, she starred in Debipaksha, Shudhu Tumi, Badsha The King and Bandhan. While the first two performed poorly at the box office, Bandhan  was a huge success in Bengal and was a blockbuster at the box office. It was also the highest grossing Bengali film of 2004.

In 2005, Mallick appeared in Shubhodrishti, Manik, Yuddho and Chore Chore Mastuto Bhai. In 2005, Koel Mallick entered the Odia film industry for the first time. In her first Odia film, Koel acted opposite the superstar of the Odia film industry, Anubhav Mohanty. She appeared in Yuddho opposite actors Mithun Chakraborty and Debashree Roy. The film recorded an initial collection of  12 million (12 million) in its first week. In 2006, she took on a more serious role in MLA Fatakeshto in which she played a reporter. She also starred in the Bengali remake of Love Story, the 2008 film Love.

Television 
Mallick made her television debut with Zee Bangla's first Mahalaya in the year 2007 as Devi Mahisasuramardini and her various avatars. She also appeared in Didi No. 1 in year 2010 as a celebrity contestant. She also host her first talk-show Katha O Kahini. The show went on to the channel Star Jalsha. In 2013 Koel was on TV again as a celebrity judge in the Bengali version of Jhalak Dikhhla Jaa along with renowned Bollywood choreographer Remo D'Souza. The show aired on ETV Bangla. She also starred in Dance Bangla Dance Junior as a Judge and in Season 11 as a celebrity judge. She was also seen in Zee Bangla's various reality shows like Rannaghor, Dadagiri Unlimited, Didi No. 1

She and Jeet was also seen as a guest in Star Jalsha serial Sansar Sukher Hoy Romonir Gune for the promotion of the movie 100% Love. Mallick has also appeared on the popular soap Bojhena Se Bojhena which is also aired on STAR Jalsha. Apart from these, she played the role of Devi Mahisasurmardini in Mahalaya. Zee Bangla telecasted its first Mahalaya in 2007 and she played the role of Devi Mahisasurmardini for the first time in Zee Bangla Mahalaya 2007. So she is the first Mahisasurmardini of Zee Bangla Mahalaya.

Brand endorsements 
Mallick has endorsed a variety of multi-national brands and has done television commercials for TVS Motor Company, Fair & Lovely, Panasonic, Vaseline etc.

Personal life 

Koel Mallick married Nispal Singh (Rane) on 1 February 2013. They had been in a relationship for seven years before that, but both of them had decided to keep their relationship away from the glamour world of Tollywood.  On 1 February 2020 she announced on Instagram that she is expecting her first child. On 5 May 2020, at 05:00am, Mallick gave birth to a baby boy.

Filmography 

 All films are in Bengali unless otherwise noted.

Television

Mahalaya

Awards 
 4th Tele Cine Awards 2004 for the film Nater Guru (2003)
 2006 Kalakar Awards, for Shubhodrishti (2005)
 ZEE Bangla Gourav Samman Award for Best Actress (Bolo Na Tumi Amar, 2010)
 Star Jalsha Award for Best Actress (Dui Prithibi, 2010)
 BFJA Awards 2013 for Best Actress Hemlock Society (2012)
 ZEE Bangla Gourav Samman Award for Best Actress (Hemlock Society, 2012)
 Star Jalsha Award For the best Actress Arundhati (2014 film)
 Films and Frames Digital Film Awards for Best Actress Critics Choice (Mitin Mashi, 2019)

References

External links 

 
 

1982 births
Actresses from Kolkata
Gokhale Memorial Girls' College alumni
Indian film actresses
Kalakar Awards winners
Living people
University of Calcutta alumni